Story editor is a job title in motion picture and television production, also sometimes called "supervising producer". In live action television, a story editor is a member of the screenwriting staff who edits scripts, pitches stories, and reports to the producers above them. In animation television, the story editor is the head writer and serves as a lead creative on a series, often doubling as a showrunner or co-showrunner themselves.

Live Action 
The story editor has many responsibilities, including finding new script/breakdown writers, developing stories with writers, and ensuring that scripts are suitable for production. The story editor will work closely with the writer on each draft of their story and script, giving the writer feedback on the quality of their work, suggesting improvements that can be made while also ensuring that practical issues, like continuity and correct running time, are adhered to. When a script is past due, multiple people may write an act. Many primetime series have an executive story editor and a story editor.

Marc Abrams of the TV series The Bernie Mac Show said, "As you go from show to show you learn that each has its own temperature and its own etiquette. You recognize your role on that particular show. Certain show runners encourage the lower-level writers to pitch ideas, others don't. Some want ideas well thought out before they are presented, others like to hear the kernel of an idea that could be expanded."

Animation 
In animation, the Story Editor is not a lower-level writer, but rather the head writer of the series who oversees the writers' room, working directly with the showrunner or serving as a showrunner themselves. Their role involves brainstorming ideas, determining the direction of the show, directing the writing staff in breaking episodes and season arcs, and doing rewrites for the finished scripts. They collaborate with the executive producers and department heads to achieve a shared vision for the series.

Notable story editors
Mara Brock Akil
Josh Berman
Kay Cannon
Firan Chisolm
Bobak Esfarjani
D. C. Fontana
Ashley Gable
Donald Glover
Dee Johnson
Mindy Kaling
Angela Kang
Andrew Lipsitz
Arika Mittman
Chelsea Peretti
Luvh Rakhe
William James Royce
Paul Rust
Caitlin Saunders
Robert van Scoyk
Eli Talbert

See also
Script editor
Television crew

References

Television terminology